Jo Stafford on Capitol is a 2001 compilation album of songs recorded by American singer Jo Stafford. It was released on the Collectors' Choice label on June 12, 2001.

Track listing

 Someone to Love		 	
 Georgia on My Mind		 	
 I Didn't Mean a Word I Said		 	
 Fools Rush In		 	
 September Song		 	
 Sonata		 	
 That's Where I Came In		 	
 Passing By		 	
 Love and the Weather		 	
 I'm My Own Grandmaw		 	
 Better Luck Next Time		 	
 Every Day I Love You (Just a Little Bit More)		 	
 Suspicion		 	
 Trouble in Mind		 	
 It Was Written in the Stars		 	
 By the Way		 	
 Here I'll Stay		 	
 Begin the Beguine		 	
 Just Reminiscin'''		 	
 I'm Gonna Wash That Man Right Outa My Hair		 	
 Smiles		 	
 (Just One Way to Say) I Love You		 	
 Homework		 	
 Ask Me No Questions''

References

2001 compilation albums
Jo Stafford compilation albums